"Galaxies" is a song by American electronica act Owl City, released on April 19, 2011. It is the second single from his third album, All Things Bright and Beautiful.

Background
Adam Young has stated the song is about the Space Shuttle Challenger disaster.

A lyrics video for the song premiered exclusively on Alternative Press on April 20, 2011 before it was released via YouTube on July 26, 2011.

Chart performance
On April 19, 2011, Galaxies was released as the second single from the album. After release, the song had some airplay, primarily on Christian radio stations. The song peaked at number 39 on the Billboard Christian Songs chart.

Charts

Weekly charts

Year-end charts

Release history

References

External links

2011 singles
2011 songs
Owl City songs
Universal Republic Records singles
Songs written by Adam Young